Thiruvaarur Bakthavathsalam (or Tiruvarur Bhaktavatsalam) (born 25 November 1956) is a mridangam Vidwan from a family of traditional musicians in the Tanjore district of Tamil Nadu, India. He is the recipient of the prestigious Sangeetha Kalanidhi award from The Madras Music Academy for 2021.

Early life

He initially began vocal training under his mother Sangeetha Vidushi Smt. T. R. Anandavalli and eventually started playing the Mridangam under the guidance and tutelage of his maternal uncle Mridangam Maestro Thiruvaarur Sri Krishnamurthy in gurukulavasam style. He began accompanying his musician mother in concerts from the age of nine and at the age of sixteen, he moved to Chennai, the cultural hub of Carnatic Music, performing widely in all prestigious Sabhās and organizations. As a young mridangist, he won a number of prizes in all the Sabhas in Chennai. Due to his exceptional talent, the All India Radio gave a double promotion to him when he was promoted from 'B' to 'A' grade, bypassing the 'B high' grade. Soon after this rare achievement, he went on to attain the coveted Top grade from the All India Radio, making him one of the most celebrated artists at a very young age. He also had the rare privilege of playing at the opening ceremony of the 1992 Summer Olympic games held in Barcelona, Spain.

Sri Bakthavathsalam was attracted to spirituality even as a child. This naturally drew him to all the religious ashrams and mutts in South India. Over the years, he became very close to the heads of several mutts, ashrams, and spiritual Gurus. Naturally, he felt very blessed to be conferred his first title, “Mridanga Vadya Mani” by Paramacharya Sri Chandrasekara Saraswathi Swamigal of Kanchi Mutt. He was the youngest to receive this award among many other veterans.

Style

Though he belongs to the Tanjore style of playing, he developed his own individual style, which focuses on the overall up-gradation of the concert as a whole and not just the rhythm side alone. He is known for his vigorous and energetic playing and also his expertise in playing for varieties of kritis and compositions. In the year 1984, after hearing him play at the Music Academy in Chennai, Pt. Ravi Shankar invited him over to join his ensemble for an international tour.

He founded the Laya Madhuraa School of Percussion in the year 2000 and has trained several students across the world. Many of his disciples are star performers accompanying all the top-ranking and popular artists of today. Some have their own schools in different parts of India and abroad (New Delhi, Kerala, Karnataka, Canada, USA, etc.) Many of his students are also teaching at schools and universities.

Career

Dr. Bakthavathsalam has the distinction of having shared stage-space with numerous yesteryear artists and has accompanied three generations of musicians in his career. Dr. Bakthavathsalam has represented the country in many cross-continent and cross-cultural festivals held across the globe as an ambassador of Indian Classical Music and performed alongside many veteran musicians, both from the Indian system as well as many Western and contemporary systems of music. He has played in a number of fundraising concerts for different social and national issues like the Kargil Fund for the soldiers who lost their lives fighting for India, the Shankara Nethralaya, the Cancer Society, The Banyan, and many others. He has also given many  lecture demonstrations and concerts for the youth under the organization SPIC MACAY and has represented ICCR in many musical ventures across the country and around the world, to create awareness and interest in students for classical music.

He was awarded the Sangeet Natak Akademi Award by the President of India for the year 2006, and the Kalaimamani award by the Government of Tamil Nadu. Several Sabhas in Chennai and other places have honored him with Lifetime Achievement awards and titles. He has established a unique outfit of traditional Carnatic music – LAYA MADHURAA “Divine Ensemble” which features traditional instruments like the Nadaswaram, Flute, and other percussion instruments and is much sought after in all social functions.

He is the first classical artist in the South to have an exclusive fan club in Madurai, Tamil Nadu, where his fans conduct music festivals, awareness programs, and other social events in his honor. His contribution to classical Carnatic music in the last fifty years has been tremendous and he hopes to continue this worthy effort in the future for the benefit of society.

For over seven years, Dr. Bakthavathsalam also served as Secretary of Sri Kanchi Kamakoti Mummoorthigal Jayanthi Vizha festival held at the Arulmigu Thyagarajaswamy Temple in Thiruvarur every year, where numerous artists take part and pay their tribute to the great composers and to the great trinity by offering timeless compositions and renderings to thousands that gather inside the temple premises. The whole event is a week long affair of grandeur and celebration of the beauty of Tamizh culture, heritage, and art.

108 Laya Madhura Mridanga Yagna 

During the 68th birthday celebrations of Parama Pujya Sri Ganapathi Sachchidananda Swamiji in May 2010, the first-ever of its kind musical presentation “ Laya Madhura Mridanga Yagna"  led by Mridanga Maestro Thiruvarur Bakthavathsalam was organized at the Avadhoota Datta Peetham in Mysore. This concept devised by Swamiji had 108 mridangam artists from all over India participating in it. Based on a new raga "Sachchidananda" dedicated to Swamiji, it explored the concept of "four" in melody and rhythm.
The number four has a special significance – we have Brahma, the creator having four faces, the four vedas, the four seasons, the most common beat in classical music is made of four units, and so on. This unique musical offering was also based on the concept of four. The 108 mridangam artists were divided into four groups, representing the four varieties of rhythm namely – Chatusram, Tisram, Khandam, and Misram. The raga "Sachchidananda" is woven around the four notes – Sa, Ga, Pa, and Dha, and the mrudangam was also tuned to each of these notes by the four groups. Apart from playing intrinsic patterns, the four groups also presented four Korvais.

With the blessings of Ganapathy Sachchidananda Swamiji and ably led by maestro Thiruvarur Bakthavathsalam, "Laya Madhura Mridanga Yagna" explored the multihued colors of melody and rhythm in the most exquisite manner and transported the listeners to a totally meditative plane.

This effort got due recognition and was officially included into the prestigious Limca Book of Records.

He has also led similar concerts in India like the 76-Mridangam Ensemble in Kanchipuram, which was held in commemoration of the 76th birthday celebrations of Pujya Sri Jayendra Saraswathi Swami, Kanchi Kamakoti Mutt, Kanchipuram.

Laya Madhuraa School of Music

Sri Thiruvaarur Bakthavathsalam is the founder, director of the "Laya Madhuraa" School of music, which has its headquarters at Chennai, Coimbatore, and Toronto, Ontario, Canada. Laya Madhuraa School of Music was inaugurated in the year 2000 with the aim to nurture and train young talents in Mrudangam, the mother of percussion in the field of South Indian Carnatic Music. The school has evolved systematic training methodologies and has been successful in producing numerous Mrudangam artists all over the world.  It is also presently working on conceptualizing innovative percussion ideologies and introducing the nuances of Layam and Nadhaam of the Mrudangam even to a common man to realize the values of the Indian traditional arts.

Laya Madhuraa School of Music also actively organizes the "LAYA MADHURAA SANGEETHOTHSAVAM" every year in Chennai. Every year during this festival, one Carnatic music veteran and one staunch promoter of Carnatic music are honored for their contribution to music. Further, the festival also features a series of concerts on all five days by eminent musicians and through this event, promotes talented youngsters and provides a platform to many promising young musicians to showcase their abilities.

Laya Madhuraa Divine Ensemble

He has created his own troupe of music ensembles named "LayaMadhura". In this ensemble he has named it as a divine ensemble by including instruments like the nadaswaram, violin, and flute as melodic instruments and the mridangam, kanjira, ghatam, morsing, and tabla as percussion. All the artists in his group are of a high caliber.

CD albums

He has to his credit two solo audio albums viz."Laya Madhuraa" and "Thala Bhakthi", and has also provided accompaniment in numerous cassettes and CDs for top-ranking artists. He has also released a CD "rhythmic symphony", a percussion jugalbandi with Pandit Anindo Chatterjee on the tabla. The latest twin CD album is the "divine ensemble" which is the new novel instrumental ensemble he has evolved with instruments like the nadaswaram, violin, flute, ghatam, kanjira, morsing, and tabla.

Awards and accolades

 "Laya Chelvam" from Muthamizh Peravai presented by Former Chief Minister of Tamil Nadu "Kalaignar" Dr. M. Karunanidhi
Honorary Doctorate degree, International Tamil University, Hawaii, USA
Lifetime Achievement Award by the Santhi Arts Foundation & Endowments (SAFE), Chennai
Lifetime Achievement Award by Carnatica, Chennai
Lifetime Achievement Award by Bharatiya Vidya Bhavan, Chennai in 2013.
Kalaimamani from the State Govt. of Tamil Nadu
Sangeetha Choodamani from Sri Krishna Gana Sabha, Chennai
Sangeet Natak Akademi Award by the President of India, 2006
Arsha Kala Bhushanam from Pujyasri Swami Dayananda Saraswati 
Isai Chelvam from Muthmizh Peravai
Mridhanga Vadhya mani
Mridhanga Nadha mani
Tamizh Isai Vendhar, Kartik Fine Arts, Chennai
Mridhanga Kala Bharathi Gana Sabha Andhra Pradesh
Laya Vadhya Samarat Indian Classical Musicians Federation, Kumbakonam
Mridhanga Chakravathi by Nemili Bala Thirupruasundari Bala Peetam
Thala Vidhyadhara Sudha by Sakthi Arul Koodam Narpavi, Tambaram
Sangeetha Kalanidhi award from The Madras Music Academy for 2021.

References 

1956 births
Living people
Indian percussionists
Recipients of the Sangeet Natak Akademi Award
People from Tiruvarur district